The 1960–61 Connecticut Huskies men's basketball team represented the University of Connecticut in the 1960–61 collegiate men's basketball season. The Huskies completed the season with an 11–13 overall record. The Huskies were members of the Yankee Conference, where they ended the season with a 6–4 record. The Huskies played their home games at Hugh S. Greer Field House in Storrs, Connecticut, and were led by fifteenth-year head coach Hugh Greer.

Schedule 

|-
!colspan=12 style=""| Regular Season

Schedule Source:

References 

UConn Huskies men's basketball seasons
Connecticut
1960 in sports in Connecticut
1961 in sports in Connecticut